The 1st Commonwealth Division was the military unit that commanded Commonwealth land forces in the Korean War. The division was a part of the multinational British Commonwealth Forces Korea, with infantry units of the British Army, Canadian Army and Australian Army, forming the bulk of the division. Additionally, the New Zealand Army supplied artillery complements and an Indian medical unit was also attached. As with the "Korean Augmentation To the United States Army" (KATUSA) programme, numerous South Korean troops were seconded to the Commonwealth division to make up numbers under a scheme known as "KATCOM".

History

Background 
Following the outbreak of the Korean War, the 27th British Commonwealth Brigade, which was the initial parent formation of Commonwealth army units in Korea, arrived in the peninsula with two British Infantry battalions in August 1950. It was reinforced by the 3rd Battalion, Royal Australian Regiment (3 RAR) in September, and by the 2nd Battalion, Princess Patricia's Canadian Light Infantry (PPCLI), in February 1951.

The brigade was subsequently re-constituted as the 28th Commonwealth Brigade in April 1951. Meanwhile, in November 1950, the brigade was joined by the 29th Independent Infantry Brigade, and in May 1951 by the 25th Canadian Infantry Brigade.

Formation 
In July 1951, the infantry brigades were combined to form the 1st Commonwealth Division, wherein the unit was 58% British forces, 22% Canadian forces, 14% Australian forces, 5% New Zealander forces, and 1% Indian forces.

The 1st Commonwealth Division was part of the US I Corps, which also included the US 1st Cavalry Division, the US 3rd and 25th Infantry Divisions, and the ROK 1st Division.

Dissolution 
It was deactivated in 1954 as part of the demobilisation of forces in Korea in the aftermath of the war, being reduced to a Commonwealth Brigade Group, and from May 1956 until its final withdrawal in August 1957 to a Commonwealth Contingent of battalion strength.

Commanders

Commanding officers
 Major-General James Cassels, 28 July 1951 – 7 September 1952
 Major-General Michael West, 7 September 1952 – 1953
 Major-General Horatius Murray, 1953 – 1954
Divisional Commander Royal Artillery (CRA)
 Brigadier William Pike, July 1951 – 1952
 Brigadier Guy Gregson, 1952
Divisional Commander Royal Engineers (CRE)
 Colonel ECW Myers, RE
Divisional Commander Royal Signals (CRSigs)
 Lt Col AC Atkinson, Royal Sigs
Divisional Commander Royal Army Service Corps (CRASC)
 Lt Col MGM Crosby, RASC
Assistant Director Medical Services (ADMS)
 Col G Anderton, RAMC
Divisional Commander Royal Army Ordnance Corps (CRAOC)
 Lt Col MR Maclean, RAOC
 Lt Col GJH Atkinson, RNZAOC
Divisional Commander Royal Army Electrical and Mechanical Engineers (CREME)
 Lt Col HG Good, REME

Order of battle

 Headquarters and Headquarters Company 1st Commonwealth Division
Divisional troops
Signals
1st Commonwealth Division Signals, July 1951 – July 1953
Artillery
45th Field Regiment, Royal Artillery, July–November 1951, 25 pdr
11th (Sphinx) Battery, Royal Artillery, July–November 1951, 4.2 inch mortars
170th Light Battery, Royal Artillery, July–November 1951, 4.2 inch mortars
14th Field Regiment, Royal Artillery, November 1951 – December 1952, 25 pdr
120th Light AA Battery, Royal Artillery, October 1951 – December 1952, 4.2 inch mortars
42nd Light AA Battery, Royal Artillery, November 1951 – February 1952, 4.2 inch mortars
61st Light Field Regiment, January 1952 – July 1953, 4.2 inch mortars
20th Field Regiment, Royal Artillery, December 1952 – July 1953, 25 pdr
16th Field Regiment, Royal New Zealand Artillery, July 1951 – July 1953, 25 pdr
42nd Field Regiment, Royal Artillery, December 1953– , 25 pdr
2nd Regiment, Royal Canadian Horse Artillery, July 1951 – May 1952, 25 pdr
1st Regiment, Royal Canadian Horse Artillery, May 1952 – April 1953, 25 pdr
81st Field Regiment, Royal Canadian Artillery, April 1953 – July 1953, 25 pdr
 74th (Battleax Company) Medium Battery, Royal Artillery, March–November 1953, 5.5 inch medium guns
1903 Independent Air Observation Post Flight, Royal Artillery, July 1951 – July 1953
Engineers
28th Field Engineer Regiment, Royal Engineers, July 1951 – July 1953
64th Field Park Squadron, Royal Engineers, July 1951 – July 1953
Armour
8th King's Royal Irish Hussars, July 1951 – December 1951, Centurion tank, Cromwell tank
C Squadron, 7th Royal Tank Regiment, July 1951 – October 1951, Churchill tank
5th Royal Inniskilling Dragoon Guards, December 1951 – December 1952, Centurion tank
1st Royal Tank Regiment, December 1952 – December 1953, Centurion tank
5th Royal Tank Regiment, December 1953 – December 1954, Centurion tank
C Squadron, Lord Strathcona's Horse (Royal Canadians) (2nd Armoured Regiment), May 1951 – June 1952, M4 Sherman tank
B Squadron, Lord Strathcona's Horse (Royal Canadians) (2nd Armoured Regiment), June 1952 – May 1953, M4 Sherman tank
A Squadron, Lord Strathcona's Horse (Royal Canadians) (2nd Armoured Regiment), December 1953– , M4 Sherman tank
Medical
60th (Para) Indian Field Ambulance, November 1950 – August 1953
26th Field Ambulance, RAMC, December 1950–
No 25 Field Ambulance, RCAMC, May 1951 – April 1952
No 25 Canadian Field Dressing Station, July 1951–
No 37 Field Ambulance, RCAMC, April 1952 – May 1953
No 38 Field Ambulance, RCAMC, May 1953–
Logistics
Ordnance
No 25 Canadian Infantry Brigade Group Ordnance Company, May 1951 - Jan 1952
28th Commonwealth Infantry Brigade Ordnance Field Park,
24th British Infantry Brigade Group Ordnance Field Park,
1st Commonwealth Division, Stores Distribution Detachment.
Workshops
10th Infantry Workshops, REME
11th Infantry Workshops, REME
16th Infantry Workshops, REME
25 Canadian Support Workshop, RCEME, May 1951 – Jan 1952
191 Infantry Workshop, RCEME, May 1951 – Apr 1955
40 Canadian Infantry Workshop, RCEME, Apr 1953 – Dec 1953
42 Infantry Workshop, RCEME, Mar 1955 – Feb 1955
1st Commonwealth Division, Tank Workshop
1st Commonwealth Division, Signals Workshop
1st Commonwealth Division, Recovery Unit
Transport
54 Company, RCASC
57 Company, RASC
78 Company, RASC
10 Company, RNZASC 1951 – 1956
Infantry
25th Canadian Infantry Brigade
 1st Battalion, The Royal Canadian Regiment, April 1952 – November 1953
 2nd Battalion, The Royal Canadian Regiment, May 1951 – April 1952
 3rd Battalion, The Royal Canadian Regiment, March 1953 - March 1954
 1st Battalion, Princess Patricia's Canadian Light Infantry, October 1951 – November 1952
 2nd Battalion, Princess Patricia's Canadian Light Infantry, December 1950 – November 1951
 3rd Battalion, Princess Patricia's Canadian Light Infantry, October 1952 – October 1953
 1st Battalion, Royal 22e Régiment, April 1952 – April 1953
 2nd Battalion, Royal 22e Régiment, May 1951 – April 1952
 3rd Battalion, Royal 22e Régiment, April 1953 – April 1954
 27th Infantry Brigade (aka 27th British Commonwealth Brigade): 
1st Battalion, Middlesex Regiment
1st Battalion, Argyll and Sutherland Highlanders
2nd Battalion, Princess Patricia's Canadian Light Infantry, December 1950 – April 1951
3rd Battalion, Royal Australian Regiment, September 1950 – April 1951
16th Field Regiment, Royal New Zealand Artillery, January 1951 – April 1951
60th Indian Field Ambulance
 28th Commonwealth Infantry Brigade (previously organised as 27th British Commonwealth Brigade): 
 1st Battalion, The King's Own Scottish Borderers, April 1951 – August 1952
 1st Battalion, The King's Shropshire Light Infantry, July 1951 – September 1952
 1st Battalion, The Royal Fusiliers, August 1952 – July 1953
 1st Battalion, Durham Light Infantry, September 1952 – July 1953
 3rd Battalion, Royal Australian Regiment (3 RAR), July 1951 – July 1953
 1st Battalion, Royal Australian Regiment (1 RAR), June 1952 – March 1953
 2nd Battalion, Royal Australian Regiment (2 RAR), April 1953 – July 1953
 29th Infantry Brigade (previously organised as 29th Independent Infantry Brigade): 
 1st Battalion, The Royal Northumberland Fusiliers, July 1951 – October 1951
 1st Battalion, The Gloucestershire Regiment, July 1951 – November 1951
 1st Battalion, The Royal Ulster Rifles, July 1951 – October 1951
 1st Battalion, The Royal Norfolk Regiment, October 1951 – September 1952
 1st Battalion, The Leicestershire Regiment, October 1951 – June 1952
 1st Battalion, The Welch Regiment, November 1951 – November 1952
 1st Battalion, The Black Watch, June 1952 – July 1953
 1st Battalion, The King's Regiment (Liverpool), September 1952 – July 1953
 1st Battalion, The Duke of Wellington's Regiment, September 1952 – July 1953
 1st Battalion, The Royal Scots, July 1953

Notes

References

 
 

Military units and formations established in 1951
Military units and formations disestablished in 1954
1
1st Commonwealth Division
C
C
C
United Nations contingents in Korea
Military units and formations of India
1951 establishments in the British Empire
1954 disestablishments in the British Empire
Commonwealth
Divisions of New Zealand
Divisions of Australia
Divisions of Canada